This is a list of science fiction films that premiered between 1 January 1930 and 31 December 1939. In Phil Hardy's book Science Fiction (1983), the 1930s were described as a period where both science fiction literature and cinema were "in turmoil" and that by examining films of decade that "it is clear that Science Fiction, in no sense, can be seen as an ongoing genre in the thirties".

In the United States, films would use a science fiction plot device or character such as a mad scientist, but more closely resembled contemporary genres like horror, thriller and detective films. The films enhanced other genres such as melodrama (Six Hours to Live), Westerns (The Phantom Empire) and most predominantly horror films such as Frankenstein or Dr. Jekyll and Mr. Hyde. Towards the middle of the decade, science fiction was prominent in low budget Poverty Row films and film series. European films such as End of the World and F.P.1 antwortet nicht and Things to Come continued the line of prophetic speculation of Fritz Lang's film Metropolis. Towards the end of the 1930s as political climate was changing in Europe, films such as Bila Nemoc used science fiction elements to imagine the horrors of World War II.

Few films from the era have been nominated or won awards, these include Fredric March winning an Academy Award for Best actor for Dr. Jekyll and Mr. Hyde while the film received nominations for best writing and cinematography. Gilbert Kurland was nominated for Best Sound Recording for Bride of Frankenstein.

See also
 History of science fiction films

Notes

References
 
 
 
 

 
 
 
 
 
 
 
 

 
1930s
Lists of 1930s films by genre